Janhit Mein Jaari is a 2022 Indian Hindi-language comedy-drama film directed by Jai Basantu Singh and written by Raaj Shaandilyaa. It stars Nushrat Bharucha, Paritosh Tripathi, Vijay Raaz, Sahiil Sagar as Friend Voice Dubbed among others. 

It was released theatrically on 10 June 2022 and later premiered on video on demand on ZEE5 from 15 July 2022. It received positive reviews from critics and audience, with praise for the message, humour and performances.

Plot 
A story about a young girl who is a crusader and takes on a difficult job selling condoms. The film shows the struggles she faces amid the social taboo, and how she overcomes resistance from her family as well as the whole town. The film is told with Raaj Shandilya's trademark humor. The film follows a young girl selling condoms to make a living. She juggles her work towards improving women's lives, explaining the importance of protection and dealing with the resistance from her family members and in-laws

Cast 
 Nushrratt Bharuccha as Manokamna 'Mannu' Tripathi
 Vijay Raaz as Keval Prajapati
 Tinnu Anand
 Anud Singh Dhaka as Ranjan
 Brijendra Kala
 Ishtiyak Khan
 Sapna Sand
 Ishan Mishra as Achaanak Kumar
 Paritosh Tripathi
 Shaan yadav as maqdoom
 Sukriti Gupta as Babli
 Amit Jaat as Girish
 Satyam Aarakh
 Jyoti Dubey
 Aashi Malviya
 Mohit Shewani
 Gaurav Bajpayee
 Deepak Rai

Production

Development 
The film was announced by Indian boxer Mary Kom in November 2021, starring Nushrratt Bharuccha.

Filming 
The principal photography of the film started in mid-September 2021 at Gwalior, Madhya Pradesh. However production was halted in November 2021 owing to COVID-19 pandemic in India. The film was wrapped up on 17 December 2021 in Chanderi, Madhya Pradesh.

Release

Theatrical
Janhit Mein Jaari was released theatrically on 10 June 2022.

Janhit Mein Jaari earned ₹43 lacs at the domestic box office on its opening day. On the second day, the film collected ₹82 lacs. On the third day, the film collected ₹94 lacs, taking total domestic weekend collection to ₹2.19 crore.

As of 13 June 2022, the film grossed ₹2.50 crore in India.

Home media
The digital streaming rights of the film is owned by ZEE5. The film was streamed digitally on ZEE5 from 15 July 2022.

Soundtrack 

The music of the film is composed by Prini Siddhant Madhav, Amol - Abhishek and Sadhu Sushil Tiwari with lyrics  written by Sameer Anjaan, Abhishek Talented, Raaj Shaandilyaa, Niket Pandey, Sadhu Sushil Tiwari and Rohit Sharma.

On 12 May 2022, the first song titled "Parda Daari" sung by Javed Ali and Dhvani Bhanushali was unveiled.

Reception

Critical reception  
Rachana Dubey of The Times of India gave it three and a half stars out of five and found that "A punch-line heavy discussion on safe sex".

Akash Bhatnagar from Bollywood Bubble gave three and a half stars out of five and wrote, "Janhit Mein Jaari is a good and entertaining film. Nushrratt being the one with the most star-power here delivers to her promise. It's a good, clean film and deserves at least one viewing with the whole family."

References

External links 
 
 
 Janhit Mein Jaari  at ZEE5

Indian comedy-drama films
2022 comedy-drama films